"Days Like This" is a debut song co-written and recorded American country music artist Rachel Proctor.  It was released in May 2003 as the first single from the album Where I Belong.  The song reached No. 24 on the Billboard Hot Country Singles & Tracks chart.  The song was written by Proctor and Odie Blackmon.

Chart performance

References

2003 debut singles
2003 songs
Rachel Proctor songs
Songs written by Odie Blackmon
Songs written by Rachel Proctor
Song recordings produced by Chris Lindsey
BNA Records singles